Attalus of Macedonia may refer to:

Attalus (general) of Philip and Alexander
Attalus (son of Andromenes) of Alexander and Perdiccas